Syrnola karachiensis is a species of sea snail, a marine gastropod mollusk in the family Pyramidellidae, the pyrams and their allies.

Description
The ochraceous-brown, subpellucid shell is very sharply pointed. It is an attenuate species with eleven smooth straight whorls in the teleoconch. A slight canaliculation exists at the sutures. The aperture is oblong. The outer lip simple, and somewhat reflexed at the base. The columella is one-plaited.

Distribution
This marine species occurs off Pakistan.

References

External links
 To World Register of Marine Species

Pyramidellidae
Gastropods described in 1897